Paratylenchus projectus is a plant pathogenic nematode infecting several hosts including African violet, soybean and sunflower

References

External links 
 Nemaplex, University of California - Paratylenchus projectus

Tylenchida
Soybean diseases
Sunflower diseases
Ornamental plant pathogens and diseases
Agricultural pest nematodes